Lullaby is the sixth studio album by the group Celtic Woman, released on 15 February 2011. This album was originally released exclusively through donations made to PBS stations in the United States back in November 2010 to support broadcasts of the group's Songs from the Heart television special.

Performers in Lullaby are vocalists Chloë Agnew, Lynn Hilary, Lisa Kelly, Órla Fallon, Méav Ní Mhaolchatha, Hayley Westenra, and fiddler Máiréad Nesbitt. This is the second album where members both current and previous appear together, the first being The Greatest Journey.

The inspiration for this album came from fans who loved the lullaby-themed songs performed by the group. Some songs are new recordings and appear in films such as Pinocchio and Mary Poppins while some, such as "Goodnight My Angel", "Over the Rainbow", and "Walking in the Air", are re-releases from the group's previous albums.

Track listing

Notes
 On track 3, the bridge and third verse of the song are additionally edited by Agnew.
 Track 4 was originally released on the album Songs from the Heart.
 Tracks 5 and 8 were originally released on the album A New Journey.
 Track 7 is an edited version of the track originally released on the group's self-titled debut album.

Chart history

References

Celtic Woman albums
2011 albums
Manhattan Records albums